Łososiowice  is a village in the administrative district of Gmina Wołów, within Wołów County, Lower Silesian Voivodeship, in south-western Poland. The earliest mention concerning Łososiowice dates from 1208. It was destroyed in 1431 by the Hussite forces. In 1939 it had a population of 395. Prior to 1945 it was in Germany.

There is a baroque church from 1701 built there, with an inside matroneum. It has three tombstones of Stober family. It had a functioning Roman Catholic parish until 1945. The last pastor of the village, Alois Pohl, died probably during the Soviet offensive of 1945.

The village has a population of 219.

References

Villages in Wołów County